Science and engineering fairs, hosted by schools worldwide, offer students the opportunity to experience the practices of science and engineering for themselves. In the United States, the Next Generation Science Standards makes experiencing the practices of science and engineering one of the three pillars of science education.

Science fairs began in the United States in New York City in the 1930's under the auspices of a civic organization called the American Institute of the City of New York  with the effort led in New York City by Morris Meister who later founded the Bronx High School of Science. Meister believed in the educational ideas of John Dewey that focused on doing rather than just learning what already had been done. According to the New York Times article that reported about the meeting of science educators (Plans Science Club for School Pupils. May 22 1932), the goals of the after-school science club federation were two fold, to aid in the development of the scientific leaders of the next generation and at the same time foster a better understanding of science among its laymen. 

Initially, science fairs were mostly exhibits and demonstration projects or mere displays of projects, which changed after the 1939–1940 New York World’s Fair. Increasingly, science and engineering fairs became viewed by many as a way to encourage and help students find their way into science and engineering career paths. Popularity of science fairs in the United States increased in the 1950's along with interest in the sciences after the world witnessed the use of the first two atomic weapons and the dawn of television. As the decade progressed, science stories in the news, such as Jonas Salk's vaccine for polio and the launch of Sputnik, brought science fiction to reality and attracted increasing numbers of students at every level to fairs. 

Now science and engineering fairs attract students at every level -- elementary, middle and high school -- to compete in science and technology activities. Science fairs also can allow for students with intense interest in the sciences to be paired with mentors from nearby colleges and universities, so that the students have access to instruction and equipment that the local schools do not provide. This mentoring, along with coaching students for their science fair interviews, has been shown to be very important for student success.

Most countries have regional science fairs in which interested students can freely participate. Winners of these regional fairs send students to national fairs such as ISEF and CWSF. National science fairs typically send winners to international fairs such as ISEF (which is a national and an international science fair) and EUCYS. Currently, the biotechnology company-sponsored Regeneron Science Talent Search offers a grand prize of a $250,000 scholarship. The Sundance Film Festival prize-winning 2018 Science Fair (film) chronicles the competition. The 2018 book The Class chronicles a year in which science and engineering fair becomes the center of science education.

See also
 Google Science Fair
 International Science and Engineering Fair
 Interest Fair

References

Further reading

 

 Won Tesoriero, Heather. The Class: A Life-Changing Teacher, His World-Changing Kids, and the Most Inventive Classroom in America (2018) in-depth narrative of science fair students at top high school in 2016-17.  excerpt; also online review
 Delisi, J. and Pasquale, M (2019) How Can Middle School Science Fairs Help Students Meet Science Standards? 
 Grinnell, F. (2020) Reinventing Science Fairs

External links
The WWW Virtual Library: Science Fairs
"Science Fair organisers and participating schools' reflections about science fairs" best-practice report
Science Buddies List Of Science Fairs

Science education